Deh Pish-e Sofla (also Romanized as Deh Pīsh-e Soflá; also known as Deh-e Pīsh Pā’īn and Deh Pīsh-e Pā’īn) is a village in Eslamabad Rural District, in the Central District of Jiroft County, Kerman Province, Iran. At the 2006 census, its population was 1,066, in 197 families.

References 

Populated places in Jiroft County